Live Freaky Die Freaky is a stop motion-animated, musical independent film directed by John Roecker.  It is a black comedy based on the Charles Manson murders.  It premiered on DVD in the United States on January 17, 2006 and played in a few theatres on January 20, 27 and 28.

Plot
The film starts out with a futuristic Nomad from the year 3069 who accidentally discovers the book "Helter Skelter" while searching for food in a desert on the former site of Los Angeles. He mistakes the book as the Bible, and reads it as if Charles Hanson (most of the character names are derived from real people involved with the Manson murders, with their names altered by changing a letter into an 'H') is the messiah. As he reads, we flash back to 1969 where Susan Hatkins meets Charlie during a bad LSD trip. Charlie then renames her Hadie and she is accepted into his family where they plan things to change the world, and make music. After finding out that the snobby, nature hating actress Sharon Hate is supposed to be filming a movie in the desert where they are living, Charlie and the family plot to kill her. Charlie claims to get messages through songs, such as "I Want to Hold Your Hand" by The Beatles, which tell him to kill Sharon Hate.

Soon after brutally murdering Sharon Hate and her friends, Hay and Abigail, the family goes after the Ha Biancas, after Mr. Ha Bianca (who was "very rude to Squeaky") decided to build a parking lot, which would cover the entire desert, in Sharon Hate's honor. They kill him and his wife, and are later found by the police in the desert, after which they have a trial and are sentenced to death by gassing, electric chair, and hanging til dead.

We go back to the Nomad in 3069 who carves an X in his forehead and uses Charlie Manson as a sort of Messiah.

Appearances
This movie contains performances by many well known rock artists such as:
 Billie Joe Armstrong
 Mike Dirnt
 Tré Cool
 Tim Armstrong
 Davey Havok
 Kelly Osbourne
 Jane Wiedlin
 Jen Johnson
 Travis Barker
 Nick 13
 Lars Frederiksen
 Sean Yseult
 Asia Argento
 Benji Madden
 Joel Madden
 Theo Kogan
And many extras such as:
 Rob Aston
 Josh Wilburn
 Jason White
 Ryan Williams
 Craig Roose

Songs
 Overture
 No Sense Makes Sense
 ... It Was A Big And Beautiful Dream ...
 Charlie?
 Bad Vibrations (One Too Many Afternoons)
 These Three Holes!
 Mechanical Man
 Cafe 666
 This Upside Down River
 Strangle A Tree
 The Pass Where The Devil Can See
 Creepy Crawl
 Healter Skelter
 August 9
 Buzzsaw Twist
 Folie A' Famille
 All The Good Things (We could have done)
 I Am Just A Reflection Of You
 We Watch You As You Sleep
 Light Fires In Your Cities
 Live Freaky Die Freaky (Your Blood Will Set You Free)

See also
 Adult animation
 List of stop-motion films
 List of animated feature films

References

External links
 
 Interview with director John Roecker about the film
 Washington Post
 Austin Chronicle
 The Advocate
 LA Weekly
 MTV.com

2006 films
2000s musical films
2000s stop-motion animated films
American animated musical films
Hellcat Records
Cultural depictions of Charles Manson
American films based on actual events
2000s English-language films
2000s American films